Mesorhizobium alhagi is a gram-negative, aerobic non-spore-forming, motile bacteria from the genus of Mesorhizobium which was isolated from wild Alhagi sparsifolia in north-western China.

References

External links
Type strain of Mesorhizobium alhagi at BacDive -  the Bacterial Diversity Metadatabase

Phyllobacteriaceae
Bacteria described in 2010